Paul is a city in Minidoka County, Idaho, founded in 1907. The population was 1,195 at the 2020 census. It is part of the Burley, Idaho Micropolitan Statistical Area. The town received its name from Charles H. Paul, an engineer who worked on the Minidoka Project.

Geography
Idaho State Highway 25 passes east-west through the city, and State Highway 27 leads south from the city center.

Demographics

2010 census
As of the census of 2010, there were 1,169 people, 446 households, and 311 families residing in the city. The racial makeup of the city was 76.6% White, 0.9% Native American, 0.8% Asian, 18.0% from other races, and 3.6% from two or more races. Hispanic or Latino of any race were 28.5% of the population.

There were 446 households, of which 34.3% had children under the age of 18 living with them, 56.7% were married couples living together, 7.4% had a female householder with no husband present, 5.6% had a male householder with no wife present, and 30.3% were non-families. 26.7% of all households were made up of individuals, and 13.9% had someone living alone who was 65 years of age or older. The average household size was 2.62 and the average family size was 3.20.

The median age in the city was 34.3 years. 28.7% of residents were under the age of 18; 7.2% were between the ages of 18 and 24; 24.7% were from 25 to 44; 23.5% were from 45 to 64; and 16% were 65 years of age or older. The gender makeup of the city was 51.3% male and 48.7% female.

2000 census
As of the census of 2000, there were 998 people, 409 households, and 276 families residing in the city. The racial makeup of the city was 83.27% White, 0.10% African American, 0.80% Native American, 0.40% Asian, 12.22% from other races, and 3.21% from two or more races. Hispanic or Latino of any race were 16.33% of the population.

There were 409 households, out of which 31.3% had children under the age of 18 living with them, 54.0% were married couples living together, 8.6% had a female householder with no husband present, and 32.3% were non-families. 28.4% of all households were made up of individuals, and 17.6% had someone living alone who was 65 years of age or older. The average household size was 2.44 and the average family size was 2.99.

In the city, the population was spread out, with 27.3% under the age of 18, 7.3% from 18 to 24, 24.7% from 25 to 44, 22.2% from 45 to 64, and 18.4% who were 65 years of age or older. The median age was 39 years. For every 100 females, there were 94.9 males. For every 100 females age 18 and over, there were 90.1 males.

The median income for a household in the city was $30,417, and the median income for a family was $35,179. Males had a median income of $33,375 versus $21,172 for females. The per capita income for the city was $15,627. About 9.8% of families and 14.6% of the population were below the poverty line, including 19.3% of those under age 18 and 9.7% of those age 65 or over.

Education
Paul is served by the Minidoka County Schools system.

Students are zoned to:
 Paul Elementary School (Paul)
 West Minico Middle School (unincorporated Minidoka County)
 Minico High School (unincorporated Minidoka County)

See also
 Amalgamated Sugar Company
 Camp Rupert

References

Cities in Minidoka County, Idaho
Cities in Idaho
Burley, Idaho micropolitan area
Populated places established in 1907